An air vortex cannon is a toy that releases doughnut-shaped air vortices — similar to smoke rings but larger, stronger and invisible. The vortices are able to ruffle hair, disturb papers or blow out candles after travelling several metres.

The design consists of a short and broad barrel with a slight taper, closed by a flexible diaphragm at the larger end. The diaphragm is internally attached to the barrel by elastic strips. The cannon is "armed" by pulling the diaphragm out, distending the elastic bands, and is "fired" by releasing the diaphragm. The diaphragm quickly pushes a quantity of air out of the open end, creating a vortex ring.

An air vortex cannon can be made easily at home, from just a cardboard box.
 
Air cannons are used in some amusement parks such as Universal Studios to spook or surprise visitors.

The commercial Airzooka was developed by Brian S. Jordan who claims to have conceived it when still a boy. A feature of the Airzooka is a loose non-elastic polythene membrane, tensioned by a bungee cord, rather than elastic membranes. This allows a much greater volume of air to be displaced.

In 2012 a large air vortex cannon was built for Czech television show Zázraky přírody (English: Wonders of Nature).

See also
 Bubble ring
 Vortex ring gun

References

External links 
 Home made vortex cannon using a cardboard box and a smoke machine from The URN Science Show.

Toy weapons
Vortices